Erpe may refer to:

 Erpe, a village in East Flanders, Belgium
 Erpe (Spree), a river in Brandenburg and Berlin, Germany
 Erpe (Twiste), a river in Hesse, Germany

See also
 Erpe-Mere, a municipality in East Flanders, Belgium
 Thomas van Erpe (1584–1624), Dutch Orientalist
 Erp (disambiguation)